Imanol Agirretxe Arruti (born 24 February 1987) is a Spanish retired footballer who played as a striker. 

Aside from a short loan spell at Castellón, his entire professional career was spent at Real Sociedad. At the latter club, he amassed competitive totals of 272 matches and 75 goals, while in La Liga alone he scored 56 times from 180 appearances.

Club career
Born in Usurbil, Gipuzkoa, Agirretxe was a product of Real Sociedad's youth system. He first appeared with the first team in 2004–05, making three substitute appearances – in his second, a 1–3 home loss against Málaga CF on 15 May 2005, he managed to score after just 16 minutes on the pitch; in the following three seasons, however, he only totalled nine league matches, and also served a six-month loan spell at CD Castellón in the Segunda División.

In 2008–09's second tier, Agirretxe appeared regularly for the main squad, mainly due to the serious injury to Iñigo Díaz de Cerio. He netted nine goals in 28 games, but the Basques again failed to return to La Liga.

Again mainly a backup after the signing on loan of Uruguayan Carlos Bueno, Agirretxe scored six times the following campaign in 36 matches, as Real finally promoted as champions. In 2011–12, following Raúl Tamudo's departure and the continuous physical problems that bothered Joseba Llorente, he was finally made first-choice, and netted three goals in his first two league games: two against Sporting de Gijón in a 2–1 away win and one against FC Barcelona, helping the hosts come from behind 0–2 for an eventual 2–2 draw; he finished with ten successful strikes, only trailing Carlos Vela in the squad.

On 19 January 2013, Agirretxe came from the bench for the last six minutes of a home fixture against Barcelona, and scored in the last minute to seal a 3–2 comeback victory (Real Sociedad trailed 0–2 in the 40th minute) and end the Catalans' unbeaten domestic run. At the season's end he again finished second in team scoring (13), again only behind Vela.

At the start of the 2015–16 campaign, Agirretxe was in the best goalscoring form of his career, scoring 12 times in the first 13 league matches. He suffered an injury to his left ankle during a loss to Real Madrid at the Santiago Bernabéu Stadium on 30 December 2015, and returned sooner than expected the following February, netting in a 1–1 home draw against Málaga after only seven minutes on the pitch. Shortly after, however, he relapsed from his ailment, going on to be sidelined for more than one year; in June 2016, while absent from playing, he renewed his contract until summer 2020.

After impressing in the 2017–18 pre-season, Agirretxe made a return to competitive action on 19 August 2017 following a 20-month hiatus, replacing captain Xabi Prieto as their team came from behind to defeat hosts RC Celta de Vigo 3–2 in the opening round of league fixtures. He made 13 appearances in all competitions, but only played more than 45 minutes in two of them.

On 29 August 2018, Agirretxe announced his retirement from playing professionally at the age of 31, having never fully recovered from his 2015 injury. In a press conference, he expressed that it was "A very happy day", reflecting on his satisfaction in the decision he had made after his long struggles to return to peak condition, also speaking of his pride in representing Real Sociedad and respect he had for the staff at the club.

Career statistics

Club

Honours
Real Sociedad
Segunda División: 2009–10

Notes

References

External links
Real Sociedad official profile

1987 births
Living people
People from Usurbil
Sportspeople from Gipuzkoa
Spanish footballers
Footballers from the Basque Country (autonomous community)
Association football forwards
La Liga players
Segunda División players
Segunda División B players
Antiguoko players
Real Sociedad B footballers
Real Sociedad footballers
CD Castellón footballers
Spain youth international footballers
Basque Country international footballers